The Hustler It is the second studio album between Willie Colón and Héctor Lavoe. Released in 1968 by Fania Récords. from this álbum comes the Bolero Que Lio which also forms an important role in Marc Anthony álbum El Cantante, which was a "Tribute To Héctor Lavoe" together with the movie of the same name.

Cover
The image of Willie posing in front of a pool table on the cover is a reference to the 1961 film The Hustler featuring Paul Newman and Jackie Gleason. The photo was shot at Jerry Masucci's father's Ridgewood Grove Billiards in Yonkers, New York.

Track listing
 "The Hustler" Colón – 6:29
 "Que Lío" Cuba, Lavoe, Colón – 4:35
 "Montero" Colón, Lavoe – 4:20
 "Se Acaba Este Mundo" Colón – 4:15
 "Guajirón" Dimond – 5:59
 "Eso Se Baila Así" Colón – 5:15
 "Havana" Colón – 6:37

Personnel
Pablo Rosario: Bongo
Héctor "Bucky" Andrade: Conga
Nicky Marrero: Timbal
Santi González: Bass
Mark "Markolino" Dimond: Piano
Joe Santiago: Valve Trombone
Willie Colón: Valve Trombone
Héctor Lavoe: Lead Vocals
Producer: Johnny Pacheco
Recording Director: Jerry Masucci
Art Director: Izzy Sanabria
Photography: Marty Topp

References

1968 albums
Willie Colón albums
Héctor Lavoe albums
Albums produced by Johnny Pacheco